Alu Kalateh (also Romanized as Ālū Kalāteh) is a village in Estarabad-e Shomali Rural District, Baharan District, Gorgan County, Golestan Province, Iran. At the 2006 census, its population was 2,291, in 596 families.

References 

Populated places in Gorgan County